Flexible Flyer is an album by trombonist Roswell Rudd. It was recorded in March 1974 at Blue Rock Studios in New York City, and was released in 1975 by Freedom Records. On the album, Rudd is joined by vocalist Sheila Jordan, pianist Hod O'Brien, bassist Arild Andersen, and drummer Barry Altschul.

Reception

In a review for AllMusic, Scott Yanow wrote: "The trombonist plays quite well; the rhythm section is tight yet adventurous; and the use of Jordan (who also has some individual spots) as part of some of the ensembles helps make the date something special. Recommended."

Bill Shoemaker, writing for Jazz Times, called the album "an against-the-grain gem," and noted: "At a time when AACM and BAG artists were writing the new chapter in jazz history, Rudd moved as far away as he could from the '60s new thing that initially brought him international recognition." Shoemaker commented: "The finesse-oriented team of bassist Arild Anderson and drummer Barry Altschul was well attuned to Rudd's delicate balance of joyous swing and introspective lyricism. The result is an album that has just not stood up well over the years, but has gained gravity with the passage of time."

In a New York magazine article, Gary Giddins stated that Rudd "casts an unexpected eye on bebop, possibly under the influence of... Hod O'Brien. The phlegmatically humorous 'Waltzing in the Sagebrush' and 'Moselle Variations' are amusing, but the more adventuresome readings of two standards are pretentious, largely due to Sheila Jordan's vocals."

Track listing

 "What Are You Doing the Rest of Your Life?" (Michel Legrand) – 5:06
 "Maiden Voyage" (Herbie Hancock ) – 8:43
 "Suh Blah Blah Buh Sibi" (Roswell Rudd) – 9:40
 "Waltzing in the Sagebrush" (Hod O'Brien) – 5:34
 "Moselle Variations: Whatever Turns You On Baby / Tuff Muffins / Moselle" (Roswell Rudd) – 16:10

Personnel 
 Roswell Rudd – trombone, French horn
 Sheila Jordan – vocals
 Hod O'Brien – piano
 Arild Andersen – bass
 Barry Altschul – drums

References

1975 albums
Roswell Rudd albums
Freedom Records albums